Bengy-sur-Craon is a commune in the Cher department in the Centre-Val de Loire region of France.

Geography
The commune is served by a TER railway link to Bourges.

The river Airain forms part of the commune's southeastern border.

Population

Sights
 The oldest parts of the church of St.Pierre, the choir, dates from the twelfth century. The west door is 13th century. The two-storey bell tower, possibly inspired by an earlier form, is modern. It has been listed since 1913 as a monument historique by the French Ministry of Culture.
 Roman remains, including a mosaic.
 A barn at Champ des Vignes, built 1731, is typical of the region. It has been listed since 1989 as a monument historique.
 The medieval site at Bouchetin.

See also
Communes of the Cher department

References

External links

 
 

Communes of Cher (department)